Lipscomb County is a county located in the U.S. state of Texas. As of the 2020 census, its population was 3,059. Its county seat is Lipscomb. The county was created in 1876 and organized in 1887. It is named for Judge Abner Smith Lipscomb, a secretary of state of the Republic of Texas.

Geography

Major highways
  U.S. Highway 60
  U.S. Highway 83
  State Highway 15
  State Highway 23
  State Highway 213
  State Highway 305

Adjacent counties
 Beaver County, Oklahoma (north)
 Ellis County, Oklahoma (east)
 Hemphill County (south)
 Roberts County (southwest)
 Ochiltree County (west)

Demographics

Note: the US Census treats Hispanic/Latino as an ethnic category. This table excludes Latinos from the racial categories and assigns them to a separate category. Hispanics/Latinos can be of any race.

As of the census of 2000, 3,057 people, 1,205 households, and 845 families were residing in the county.  The population density was 3 people per square mile (1/km2).  The 1,541 housing units averaged 2 per square mile (1/km2).  The racial makeup of the county was 82.86% White, 0.52% African American, 1.37% Native American, 0.07% Asian, 12.99% from other races, and 2.19% from two or more races.  About 20.71% of the population were Hispanics or Latinos of any race. In terms of ancestry, 19.7% were of German, 11.8% were of Irish, 10.4% were of English, 7.8% were of American, 2.6% were of Scottish, 2.4% were of French, 1.8% were of Dutch.

Of the  1,205 households,  32.50% had children under the age of 18 living with them, 62.10% were married couples living together, 5.90% had a female householder with no husband present, and 29.80% were not families. About 28.00% of all households were made up of individuals, and 16.20% had someone living alone who was 65 years of age or older.  The average household size was 2.50, and the average family size was 3.06.

In the county, the population distribution was 27.60% under the age of 18, 5.90% from 18 to 24, 24.70% from 25 to 44, 23.40% from 45 to 64, and 18.40% who were 65 years of age or older.  The median age was 40 years. For every 100 females, there were 94.60 males.  For every 100 females age 18 and over, there were 93.00 males.

Males had a median income of $28,750 versus $20,034 for females. The per capita income for the county was $16,328. About 12.90% of families and 16.70% of the population were below the poverty line, including 23.50% of those under age 18 and 12.40% of those age 65 or over.

Communities

Towns
 Booker (small part in Ochiltree County)
 Darrouzett
 Follett
 Higgins

Census-designated place
 Lipscomb (county seat)

Politics

See also

 List of museums in the Texas Panhandle
 National Register of Historic Places listings in Lipscomb County, Texas
 Recorded Texas Historic Landmarks in Lipscomb County

References

External links

 Lipscomb County government's website
 
 Lipscomb County Profile from the Texas Association of Counties
 Historic images from Wolfcreek Heritage Museum in Lipscomb

 
1887 establishments in Texas
Populated places established in 1887
Texas Panhandle